In molecular biology, kanamycin nucleotidyltransferase  (KNTase) is an enzyme which is involved in conferring resistance to aminoglycoside antibiotics. It catalyses the transfer of a nucleoside monophosphate group from a nucleotide to kanamycin. This enzyme is dimeric with each subunit being composed of two domains. The C-terminal domain contains five alpha helices, four of which are organised into an up-and-down alpha helical bundle. Residues found in this domain may contribute to this enzyme's active site.

References

Protein domains